Louis "Lou" Paul was a Major League Baseball player who played for the Philadelphia Athletics in .

It is not known were and when Paul was born or died.

External links

Major League Baseball catchers
Philadelphia Athletics (NL) players
19th-century baseball players
Year of birth unknown
Year of death unknown